Centreville is a rural farming community in Kings County, Nova Scotia, Canada, located 10 kilometres north of Kentville on Route 359. As of 2021, the population was 1,159. Route 309 and Route 221 cross at the settlement.  The village was once a junction on the Cornwallis Valley Railway branchline of the Dominion Atlantic Railway.

Demographics 

Notable residents

Centreville was home to the 1930s artist, Charles Macdonald, famous for his work in concrete.  His innovative concrete home in Centreville is now the Charles Macdonald Concrete House Museum.  Another important Centreville resident was Roscoe Fillmore, a well-known gardener, greenhouse operator, Marxist, and author.  Macdonald and Fillmore were members of a group of moderate leftists who regularly met in Centreville during the 1930s and 40s and became known as "the Centreville Socialists".

Businesses
Centreville is home to several businesses, including:
 Delft Haus B&B (1942 Hwy 359)
 D.O. Sanford's Garage Ltd. (1905 Hwy 359)
 Footes Farm Market (1744 Hwy 359)
 Veldhoven Upholstery (1000 Sherman Beltcher Rd.)
Eagle Crest Golf Course (2075 Lakewood Road)

Religious Institutions
Centreville is home to a few religious institutions, including:
 Baptist Church
 Kingdom Hall

References

External links
 Centreville Community Website

Communities in Kings County, Nova Scotia
Designated places in Nova Scotia